George Mane Vujnovich (May 31, 1915 – April 24, 2012) was an American intelligence officer for the Office of Strategic Services during World War II. He is known for his role in the organization of Operation Halyard, a successful operation that evacuated over 500 downed Allied airmen from Serbia.

Early life 
Vujnovich was born in Pittsburgh, Pennsylvania to two Serbian immigrants. After completing high school he attended the University of Belgrade in Yugoslavia. While there he met his wife Mirjana Lazich. In 1941 he witnessed the bombing of Belgrade by Nazi Germany prompting him and Mirjana to flee to Budapest, Hungary. From there they continued fleeing to Turkey then to Jerusalem then finally to Cairo. When they arrived there it was not long before the Nazi Afrika Korps led by Erwin Rommel began to push into Egypt. While in Cairo, he landed a job with Pan American Airways who then relocated him and his wife to Ghana to a United States controlled air base there.

Wartime and Operation Halyard 
While in Ghana, the US entered the war and militarized the commercial airline company. At that point he was commissioned into the US Army and subsequently transferred to another US controlled air base in Nigeria where he was made base commander. The Army recognized his Serbian background and experience in Yugoslavia and recruited him to help the US assist resistance efforts in the Balkans. They sent him to training in Virginia and then he was stationed in Bari, Italy.

In the summer of 1944, US bombers went on a bombing run to take out Nazi oil fields in Romania but many were shot down over Yugoslavia. Vujnovich then came up with Operation Halyard, a plan to get them out by building a secret airfield. He trained Serbian speaking agents to conduct this operation. He taught them how to blend in by showing them small things such as tying their shoes the Serbian way among other things. The agents parachuted in and led the operation to a success. Over 500 airmen were rescued with huge help of Gen. Draža Mihailović and his chetniks forces from Yugoslavian Royal Forces.

Post-War 
After the war was over he and Mirjana settled in New York City where they had a daughter together. Shortly after moving there he began a new career selling aircraft parts. He did this until he retired in the 1980s but continued doing consulting work in the field well into his 90s.

In 2003 his wife, Mirjana Lazich, died.

In 2010, Vujnovich received the Bronze Star for his role in the operation.

In 2012 he himself died at the age of 96.

References

1915 births
2012 deaths
United States Army personnel of World War II
American people of Serbian descent
Military personnel from Pittsburgh
People of the Office of Strategic Services
United States Army officers
University of Belgrade alumni